The California Academy of Mathematics and Science (CAMS) is a public magnet high school in Carson, California, United States focusing on science and mathematics. Its California API scores are fourth-highest in the state.

Located on the campus of California State University, Dominguez Hills, CAMS shares many facilities with the university, including the gymnasium, the student union, the tennis courts, the pool, the library and a few of the parking lots. It is a National "No Child Left Behind" Blue Ribbon (2011) and California Distinguished school. The No Child Left Behind blue ribbon was only presented to 32 public schools nationwide. Newsweek states in its top 1200 High Schools in the USA, CAMS is in the top 4% taking number 281 in 2006.

In the December 2007, Newsweek released the results of a two-year study to determine the 100 best High Schools in the United States of America. Out of the 18,000+ schools reviewed, CAMS made it into the top 100 as number 21. As of August 24, 2016, CAMS moved up in ranking to the 100th best high school in the nation. In California CAMS is ranked 10th in the state.

According to U.S. News & World Report, as of November 2019 CAMS is rated as the 46th best high school in the nation, and the 5th best in California. It also ranks as the best magnet high school in California.

Unlike similar schools such as the Illinois Mathematics and Science Academy and the North Carolina School of Science and Mathematics, CAMS is non-residential, drawing its students solely from most of Long Beach, portions of Los Angeles, and some cities of the South Bay region. Students are admitted only as freshmen. In 2016, the admissions process was changed and is now based solely on academic achievement in middle school. The prior interviewing and applications process was discontinued due to a legal settlement. In the past, applicants from different grade levels were allowed to apply and be accepted, but due to the strict, demanding curriculum at CAMS, the school felt incoming students from other grade levels would be unable to keep up, as they would be unaccustomed to such a curriculum.

General information
The California Academy of Mathematics and Science (CAMS) opened on the California State University at Dominguez Hills (CSUDH) campus in 1990, the product of partnerships among CSUDH, the California State University’s Chancellor’s Office, a consortium of eleven local school districts, and defense industries.  Long Beach Unified School District serves as the managing school district fiscal agent. Today, CAMS ranks in the top ten schools in California on the NCLB Academic Performance Index; its students score well above state and national averages on the math and verbal SATs. Average student daily attendance in 2003-04 was 98%. Attrition is less than 5% for all reasons, as opposed to a 50% drop-out rate in some local high schools, and 95% of CAMS students go on to four-year colleges and universities, including the most selective and prestigious in the nation. (Approximately 5% attend community colleges.)

Although CAMS winnows about 175 students from about a thousand of 9th grade applicants each year, CAMS does not rank its applicants for acceptance, but accepts students from each of its 75 feeder schools including predominately inner-city middle schools. Its mission is to “defy the odds” and prove that students, especially those from academically deprived environments, can excel in math and science, given a setting that features integrated curriculum, teamwork, and real world applications of learning. Faculty refer to CAMS as a “talent development program.”

Class size is relatively large, between 30-40 students.  The school receives about $5,500 per student annually, placing CAMS is on par with the state average for high schools. (CAMS’s base funding is $4,400 per student; private donations and special legislative funding make up the rest.)

Campus
Because CAMS is on the CSUDH campus, juniors and seniors may enroll in university courses (and some CAMS teachers teach at CSUDH). In the past, students were able to begin taking courses on CSUDH campus as early as their sophomore year.  CAMS students may graduate with as many as 20 college credits—an advantage for students applying to selective colleges and/or advancing to early college graduation, particularly with CSUDH summer classes through a Honda-sponsored program. Many of these students receive generous scholarship awards to help them afford higher education costs.

The school oversees numerous internship and summer programs with business partners, matching students with professionals from an industry of the student’s choice. Mentors from local industries help bridge the gap between the classroom and the “real world,” inspiring students to think beyond high school. One mentor who is still in contact with students he mentored over the years said, “I am most tough on time management, which I think helped them be successful in their studies.”

History
Created in 1990 by Dr. Kathleen Clark, CAMS was originally composed of the Southern Academic Complex (SAC) and was relatively small in comparison to now. About six years ago new buildings were constructed to help accommodate the students population. Now phase II is complete. The last building was finished midway through the 2007-2008 school year. Only CAMS seniors are currently granted access to CSUDH's newly completed student union during lunch hours. Dr. Clark retired at the end of the 2006-2007 school year after having been principal for as long as the graduating class of 2007 had been alive. Dr. Filer, previously vice-principal, became the new principal beginning with the 2007-2008 school year. Dr. Filer retired at the beginning of the 2013-2014 school year, and Mr. Brown became the principal.

CAMS also has a lot of social activities and clubs to participate in.  A few include Robotics, Test Code, Key Club, Society of Women Engineers, Filmmakers Club, Photography Club, Biomed Club, the Tennis team, etc.

Notable alumni
Jeremiah Abraham - Film and Television Producer, Founder & CEO of Tremendous Communications
Robert Butler III - Film director, producer and podcaster
Kun Gao - Entrepreneur, Founder and CEO of Crunchyroll
Johari Gardner - Music producer
Leila Janah - Social Entrepreneur, Founder and CEO of Samasource
Chester Pitts - Seattle Seahawks left guard
Myles Williams - Engineer, founder and CEO of Prophets Only

Extracurricular activities
Students at CAMS enjoy a variety of extracurricular activities, including sports (volleyball, soccer, and tennis), Dance Team, Key Club, PI (Pacific Islander) Club, Chess Club, Math Club, M.E.Ch.A., Test Code (formerly Computer Science Club), Pinoy Club, Black Student Alliance (BSA), Gay-Straight Alliance (GSA), National Honor Society (NHS), Future Medical Professionals, Associated Student Body (ASB), Rocket Team, MATE Underwater ROV Competition (ROV) Team, National Society of Black Engineers (NSBE),  MESA (Mathematics, Engineering, Science Achievement), FIRST Robotics Competition (FRC) Team, VEX Robotics Team, Girls Build LA, Faith & Fellowship, and HOSA (Health Occupations Students of America).

FRC, Vex Robotics, ROV, NSBE, and Rocket Team allow students to apply what they have learned in math, science, and engineering to create a product worthy of competition. MESA and the Robotics Program (FRC, VEX, and ROV) are the largest organizations at CAMS whose main focus is math and science. For those interested in the medical field, students may also join HOSA, which has recently started in conjunction with the new Biotechnology pathway at CAMS. Students in the CAMS HOSA team may compete in multiple medical science categories such as medical terminology, medical math, biomedical debates, etc., at the State and National level. Since students are allowed membership in the VEX Robotics program beginning their sophomore year, most tend to join VEX Robotics that year. The Girls Build LA team at CAMS, which works to improve the community, has been awarded grant funding by the LA Promise Fund every year since 2017.

Athletics
California Academy of Math & Science beat Animo 2-1 in a CIF Southern Section Division VII semifinal on 3/3/2010 at Beckham Field at the Home Depot Center. After its third Delphic League Championship in a row under 4th-year Head Coach Jim Watwood (2010 LB Press Telegram Coach of the year) and reaching a semifinal last year, top seed CAMS (17-2-1) advanced to its first CIF final, where it faced No. 2 seed Sierra Vista. In the last seconds of the game, Sierra Vista scored on a controversial cross to tie the game 1-1. The Royals went on to lose in penalty kicks 5-4. It marked the first CIF final for CAMS soccer and the school's second CIF team title game. The CAMS girls tennis team won the school's first CIF team title in 2006.

Admissions
The school accepts residents from the following school districts:
 Compton Unified School District
 Hawthorne School District
 Inglewood Unified School District
 Lawndale Elementary School District
 Lennox School District
 Long Beach Unified School District
 Lynwood Unified School District
 Palos Verdes Peninsula Unified School District
 Torrance Unified School District
 Wiseburn School District
 Some areas of the Los Angeles Unified School District - The following middle school zones are eligible for application to CAMS:
Bethune
Carnegie
Caroldale
Carver
Clay
Curtiss
Dana
Dodson
Drew
Edison
Fleming
Gage
Gompers
Harte
Mann
Markham
Muir
Nimitz
Peary
South Gate
White
Wilmington

In addition, any private school student zoned to any of the school districts or LAUSD middle schools above is also eligible to apply to and attend CAMS.

College admissions

The Class of 2021 spans throughout California within the California State University and University of California system, although alumni especially committed to universities in Southern California. The most popular destinations within both systems are UC San Diego (23 alumni), UC Irvine (19 alumni), Long Beach State (17 alumni), Cal Poly SLO (7 alumni), and UC Berkeley (6 alumni). CAMS graduates are granted two years of free tuition at Long Beach City College, which has a dedicated Transfer Admission Guarantee resource center for transferring to the majority of UC and CSU Campuses. Admissions at private universities are sparse, but enrollments most recently occurred at Caltech, Stanford, and Yale. Below are admissions tables derived from the University of California and California State University for the Class of 2021:

References

External links
 
 CAMS Ranking (1999) 
 CAMS Ranking 2007

High schools in Los Angeles County, California
Public high schools in California
Magnet schools in California
Carson, California
Science and technology in California
1990 establishments in California
Educational institutions established in 1990